Ponemah may refer to:

Ponemah, Illinois
Ponemah, Minnesota
Ponemah, a complete physiologic data acquisition and analysis software platform used by physiologists, from Data Sciences International
Ponemah Bog, a wildlife refuge in Amherst, New Hampshire